The TVW Channel 7 6 Hour Le Mans was motor race staged at the Wanneroo Park Circuit in Western Australia on 7 June 1971. It was the 17th “Six Hour Le Mans” race to be held in Western Australia and the third to be staged at Wanneroo Park. The race was won by Ray Thackwell and Jim Mullins driving a Porsche 911S.

Groups
Cars competed in three Groups:
 Group A Sports Cars and Clubman
 Group C Improved Production Touring Cars
 Group E Series Production Touring Cars

Results

Pole position was attained by Howie Sangster with a lap time of 1:02.0

There were 31 starters in the event.

References	

Six Hours Le Mans
TVW Channel 7 6 Hour Le Mans
June 1971 sports events in Australia